The Outstanding Ontario Library Award is an annual award that is given to public libraries.  To qualify for the award libraries must "be a place where the community can come together, show a passion for literacy rates, show a strong attempt to increase readership in their city, and promote the library in a positive way."

Ontario awards
Libraries in Ontario